Jesse Wakefield Beams (December 25, 1898 in Belle Plaine, Kansas – July 23, 1977) was an American physicist at the University of Virginia.

Biography
Beams completed his undergraduate B.A. in physics at Fairmount College in 1921 and his master's degree the next year at the University of Wisconsin. He spent most of his academic career at the University of Virginia, where he received his Ph.D. in physics in 1925. He spent the next three years in a physics fellowship at Yale University, where he performed research on the photoelectric effect with Ernest Lawrence. Beams was appointed a professor of physics at the University of Virginia in 1929 and was chair of the department from 1948 to 1962. During World War II, he worked on the Manhattan Project, where his ultracentrifuge was used to demonstrate the separation of the lighter uranium isotope U-235 from other isotopes. Officials in charge of the atomic bomb project concluded, however, that Beams's centrifuges were not as likely as other methods to produce enough highly enriched uranium for a bomb in the time available, and the centrifuge program was abandoned. After World War II, centrifuge separation of uranium isotopes was perfected by German scientists and engineers working in the Soviet Union. In 1953 Beams was appointed the Francis H. Smith Professor of Physics at the University of Virginia. Beams was awarded the National Medal of Science in 1967 for his work on the ultracentrifuge. He retired from the university in 1969.

Beams' contributions include the first linear electron accelerator, the magnetic ultracentrifuge, and the application of the ultracentrifuge to the separation of isotopes and to the separation of viruses from liquids.  He held many patents in magnetic bearings and ultracentrifuges. In addition to the National Science Medal, he was awarded the American Physical Society's John Scott Medal, the Lewis Prize of the American Philosophical Society, and the University of
Virginia's first annual Thomas Jefferson Award.

He is buried at the University of Virginia Cemetery.

Patents

Publications

See also
Orders of magnitude (angular velocity)
Magnetic bearings

References

External links
National Academy of Sciences Biographical Memoir

1898 births
1977 deaths
People from Charlottesville, Virginia
University of Virginia faculty
University of Virginia alumni
National Medal of Science laureates
University of Wisconsin–Madison alumni
Manhattan Project people
People from Sumner County, Kansas
Howard N. Potts Medal recipients
Fellows of the American Physical Society
Burials at the University of Virginia Cemetery
Presidents of the American Physical Society